SK8-TV is a program shown on Nickelodeon that began in 1990 and was originally hosted by Matthew Lillard (who went by the name Matthew Lynn at the time) and Skatemaster Tate. It was a skateboard variety show that featured on-set interviews as well as off site action segments. Various techniques were introduced to television in SK8-TV including hand-held cameras and the use of multi-format film and video. The set for the show was built on location at the Pink Motel in Sun Valley, California, which was famous for its large fish shaped pool that was ideal for skateboarding.

It hosted a wide variety of skateboarders such as Christian Hosoi, Natas Kaupas, a young Tony Hawk and many others that went on to become famous and well known. It was created and produced by original Z-Boys Nathan Pratt and Mark Ashton Hunt from Binder Entertainment, directed by Stacy Peralta, who later went on to direct the retrospective documentary Dogtown and Z-Boys with production design by C.R. Stecyk III. It later resurfaced on the now-defunct Nick GAS channel in 1999 and aired until 2005.

References 
  Set artist Kevin Ancell interview by Juice (skateboarding magazine)
  Map location of the set at Google maps

External links 
 

Skateboarding mass media
1990s Nickelodeon original programming
1990 American television series debuts
1990 American television series endings
American sports television series
English-language television shows